Christopher Joseph Vogel Hill (born February 21, 1983) is an American former professional basketball player. He has played in the Ligue Nationale de Basketball, Turkish Basketball League and Basketball League Belgium.

He played college basketball for the NCAA Division I Michigan State where he twice led the Big Ten Conference in three point shots made and set the current Big Ten  single-game three point shots made record.  He was a two-time All-Big Ten Conference selection, a three-time Academic All-America and the 2005 Men's Basketball Academic All-American of the Year. He represented Team USA at the 2003 Pan American Games.

Early life
He attended Indian Creek Elementary in Indianapolis. Hill played high school basketball at Lawrence North High School in Indianapolis, Indiana where he was a 2001 All-State selection and an honorable mention Associated Press All-State honoree in 2000.  He also set school records for both career and single-season passing yardage and touchdowns as the school's quarterback.

College career
He was a two-time (2002–03 & 2003–04) Big Ten Conference leader in three point shots made, joining Shawn Respert, Louis Bullock, Craig Moore, and Jon Diebler.  He was co-MVP of the 2002–03 Michigan State Spartans men's basketball team. , he was one of three three-time Academic All-Americas in Big Ten Conference history. At the time of his 2005 recognition, he was the only two-time Academic All-America honoree in Michigan State basketball history. In 2005, he was named the Men's Basketball Academic All-American of the Year.

On January 27, 2003, he was named the Big Ten Conference Player of the Week.  During the previous week, he had had two 20-point performances. A month later on February 23, he set the past Big Ten Conference record for single-game three point shots made (10).  The record remained unmatched until Jon Diebler tied it on March 1, 2011. Bryn Forbes finally surpassed the mark on 3/2/2016.

He was selected as a member of the United States men's national basketball team for the 2003 Pan-American Games and earned the Michigan State Freshman Student-Athlete of the Year in 2002.  He was a second team All-Big Ten Selection in both 2003 and 2004. Sports Illustrated reported his natural position as point guard and noted he was an excellent golfer.

His career total of three point shots made was omitted from the 2010–11 Big Ten Media Guide, but his total of 306 would have ranked sixth entering the season, but was surpassed by both Jon Diebler (370) and Talor Battle (317). His ESPN profile shows a total of 305 career three point shots made.

Professional career
He has played for ALM Évreux Basket (2005–06) and Stade Clermontois BA of Ligue Nationale de Basketball in (2006–07) in France. He played the following season for Bandırma Banvit in Turkish Basketball League.  He has spent the last three seasons playing in the Basketball League Belgium.  He spent 2008–09 playing for Belgacom Liège Basket and then played for Spirou Charleroi.

References

External links

Eurobasket Profile
Hill's Michigan State Bio (after his junior year)
Hill at ESPN

1983 births
Living people
African-American basketball players
American expatriate basketball people in Belgium
American expatriate basketball people in France
American expatriate basketball people in Turkey
Basketball players at the 2003 Pan American Games
Basketball players from Indianapolis
Bandırma B.İ.K. players
Liège Basket players
Michigan State Spartans men's basketball players
Orléans Loiret Basket players
Shooting guards
Spirou Charleroi players
American men's basketball players
Pan American Games competitors for the United States
21st-century African-American sportspeople
20th-century African-American people